Penicillium neoechinulatum is a species of fungi in the genus Penicillium which produces patulin.

References

neoechinulatum
Fungi described in 2004